Sauna, also known as Filth or Evil Rising, is a 2008 Finnish horror film directed by Antti-Jussi Annila. The film was awarded three Jussi Awards in 2009: the best sound design, the best scenography and the best costumes. In addition, the film was nominated for best lead actor (Ville Virtanen), best lead actor (Tommi Eronen) and best editing.

Premise 

At the end of the Russo-Swedish War (1590-1595), brothers Knut and Eerik are tasked with marking the border between Finland under Swedish rule and the Tsardom of Russia. Eerik is a cartographer hardened by a long war and studied in Stockholm. On the way, the brothers kill the peasant and leave his daughter in the basement to die, but in the marshes of the north, the ghost of the girl returns to persecute them. Upon arriving at a mysterious village in the middle of swamp, the brothers find a sauna in which they hope to be washed of their sins.

Cast

Release

Home media
The film was released on DVD by Mpi Home Video on October 27, 2009. The DVD has been released in the Nordic countries as well as in Germany, the United States, Australia and the United Kingdom, as well as on blu-ray in Germany.

Reception

French film review website CinemaFantastique.net awarded it 3/4, praising the film's atmosphere, cinematography, and for effectively capturing the 16th century period. However, they criticized the film's non-linear story, and dialogue which made it difficult to fully understand the film. James Gillett from Digital Retribution gave the film a score of 4/5, writing, "Sauna is an impressive film; thematically rich and stunningly realised. It's the kind of horror movie seldom seen. Those who occasionally enjoy something a little more cerebral than your average horror effort will find themselves with a deeply rewarding and engaging film. Wash your sins. Step inside..." David Nusair from Reel Film Reviews, however, panned the film, awarding it no stars out of four, calling it "An abominable, utterly worthless piece of work".

References

External links 
 
 
 
 

Fiction set in 1595
2008 horror films
2000s historical horror films
2000s supernatural horror films
Folk horror films
Films set in the 1590s
Films set in Finland
Films set in Russia
Films shot in the Czech Republic
Films shot in Finland
Finnish horror films
2008 films
Films scored by Panu Aaltio